"" is a song by Hitomi Yaida, released as her seventh Japanese single, and the second from the album i/flancy.
A limited edition version was released also, including a different coloured case and a CD-Extra track which could be used to access a special website to book tickets to an Hitomi Yaida performance.

The B-side track "Fast Car" is a cover version of the Tracy Chapman song, Yaida continues to perform this track live and it appeared on her MTV Unplugged performance.

It reached number 4 in the charts on July 20, 2002.

Track listing

Notes

2002 singles
Hitomi Yaida songs
2002 songs
Songs written by Hitomi Yaida